FC KamAZavtotsentr Naberezhnye Chelny was a Russian football team from Naberezhnye Chelny. It played professionally from 1992 to 1994. Their best result was 5th place in Zone 6 of the Russian Second Division in 1993.

Team name history
 1992: FC KATs-Skif Naberezhnye Chelny
 1993–1994: FC KamAZavtotsentr Naberezhnye Chelny

External links
  Team history at KLISF

Association football clubs established in 1992
Association football clubs disestablished in 1995
Defunct football clubs in Russia
Sport in Naberezhnye Chelny
1992 establishments in Russia
1995 disestablishments in Russia